VTB Bank (formerly known as Vneshtorgbank, lit. 'International Trade Bank') is a Russian majority state-owned bank headquartered in various federal districts of Russia; its legal address is registered in St. Petersburg; as of 2022 company's capital stock was mostly owned by three Russian agencies.

VTB Bank and its subsidiaries form a leading Russian financial group – VTB Group uniting VTB banks located in different countries and offering a wide range of corporate banking services and products in Russia, CIS, Europe, Asia, Africa, and the U.S.

VTB was ranked 446th on the FT Global 500 2012, The Financial Times’ annual snapshot of the world's largest companies. It climbed to 210th in the ranking of the 500 largest companies in Europe, the FT Europe 500 2014, and to 127th in the FT Emerging 500 2014, the list of the 500 largest companies on the world's emerging markets.

History
VTB Bank was founded as Vneshtorgbank in 1990 with the support of the Russian State Bank and the Ministry of Finance. It was set up as a limited liability company with the aim of servicing Russia's foreign trade operations and promoting Russia's integration into the global economy.

In 2004, the bank acquired a majority stake of 85.8% in Guta Bank, which was reorganised into a retail bank, Vneshtorgbank 24 (VTB24). The bank also acquired the Armenian Armsberbank, which was later renamed VTB Armenia. In 2005, the bank acquired 75% plus three shares of the Promstroybank (PSB), which was reorganised as Bank VTB North-West and later became VTB's North-Western Regional Centre, and bought the Ukrainian bank Mriya, which was later merged with VTB Bank (Ukraine).

In 2007, the bank set up a subsidiary in Angola known as VTB África. The bank also took over Slavneftebank in Belarus and later renamed it VTB Belarus. In June, VTB became the first Russian bank to offer an initial public offering (IPO), raising $8 billion in what became the largest international banking IPO at the time.

In 2008, the bank acquired a 51% stake in AF Bank in Azerbaijan from AF Holding International, later renaming it VTB Azerbaijan. In 2010, the bank's board approved the phased acquisition of TransCreditBank from Russian Railways. In 2013, VTB carried out a secondary public offering (SPO) which raised 102.5 billion rubles ($3.3 billion) and diluted the Russian government's share in VTB from 75.5 percent to 60.9 percent. In 2022, VTB Bank extended a 630 billion rouble ($11.06 billion) credit line to be used for the purchase, repair and modernisation of the country's railway infrastructure.

In 2011, VTB invested more than $191 million for shares in the Isle of Man company DST Investment 3 which was roughly than half of the funds in Yuri Milner's DST Global. This led to Milner's large stake in Twitter. Kanton had almost no investment in Twitter. DST Investment 3 also issued shares to Alisher Usmanov's Kanton that were used to support the Kremlin's investment in Facebook.

On 7 May 2014, VTB transferred most of its DST Investment 3 to Kanton.

In 2014 prior to Russo-Ukrainian War, VTB Bank was one of the biggest banks of Ukraine.

Since 2014, the bank has been subject to political sanctions (see separate section below).

In August 2018, it was announced that VTB Bank would acquire a 75% stake in Vozrozhdenie Bank after its previous owners oversaw a "major banking collapse".

In November 2018, the National Bank of Ukraine declared the Ukrainian subsidiary of VTB Bank insolvent due to its declining liquidity and worsening financial position.

In December 2018, it was announced that VTB Bank would be acquiring controlling stakes in Sarovbusinessbank (81.1%) and Zapsibcombank (71.8%).

Mergers and acquisitions
VTB Bank took over 15 banks between 2002 and February 2019:

 Guta Bank (2004), later renamed VTB24
Bank of Moscow
TransCreditBank
Armsberbank in Armenia (2004), later renamed VTB Armenia
Promstroybank (2005), renamed Bank VTB North-West and later reorganised as VTB's North-Western Regional Centre
Eurobank in France (2005), later renamed VTB France
Evrofinance Mosnarbank in Great Britain (2005), later renamed VTB Europe Plc, and then VTB Capital Plc
Ost-West Handelsbank AG in Germany (2005), later renamed VTB Germany
United Georgian Bank (2005), later renamed VTB Georgia
Mriya in Ukraine (2006), later merged with VTB Ukraine
Slavneftebank in Belarus (2007), later renamed VTB Belarus
AF Bank in Azerbaijan from AF Holding International (2008), later VTB Azerbaijan
Vozrozhdenie (2018)
Zapsibkombank (2018)
SarovBusinessBank (2018).

VTB24, Russian Post and Post Bank
On 24 July 2015, an agreement, which as approved by Dmitry Medvedev, was signed between the bank president, Director of Russian Post, Dmitry Strashnov, and Minister of Communications and Mass Media, Nikolai Nikiforov, on the Russian Post purchase of 50 percent minus 1 share of Leto Bank (Summer Bank) from VTB24, with the purpose of reorganising it into the National Post Bank. The remaining 50 percent plus one share will be owned by VTB24 of VTB Bank. VTB CEO Kostin suggested appointing Dmitry Rudenko, the current head of Leto Bank, as the head of Post Bank (Russia).

On 28 January 2016, sets of documents were signed between VTB24 and Russian Post on establishing the Post Bank. Russian Post purchased 50 percent minus one share of the newly established Post Bank through its 100 percent subsidiary. The remaining 50 percent plus one share is owned by VTB24 of VTB Bank. Dmitry Rudenko, the head of Leto Bank of VTB24, became the head of Post Bank (Russia).

On 28 December 2017, VTB24 sells two shares to Dmitry Rudenko, the Chairman of the Board of Post Bank. VTB 24 and Russia Post have equal shares in Post Bank: each have 50 percent minus one share. VTB24 has 1,062 branches.

On 1 January 2018, VTB acquired VTB24. The integrated network has 1,350 branches.

Corporate affairs

Shareholders
In February 2011, the government floated an additional 10% minus two shares of VTB Bank. The private investors, who paid a total of 95.7 billion rubles ($3.1 billion) for the assets, included the investment funds Generali, TPG Capital, China Investment Corp, a sovereign wealth fund responsible for managing China's foreign exchange reserves, and companies affiliated with businessman Suleyman Kerimov.

In May 2013 VTB completed a secondary public offering (SPO), issuing 2.5 trillion new additional shares by public subscription. All shares were placed on Moscow's primary stock exchange. The government did not participate in the SPO, so its stake in the bank decreased to 60.9% after the subscription closed. The bank raised 102.5 billion rubles worth of additional capital. Three sovereign wealth funds, Norway's Norges Bank Investment Management, Qatar Holding LLC and the State Oil Fund of the Republic of Azerbaijan (SOFAZ) and commercial bank China Construction Bank became the largest investors during the SPO, after purchasing more than half of the additional shares issued.

In 2017 the main shareholder of VTB is the Russian government, which owned 60.9% of the lender through its Federal Agency for State Property Management. The remaining shares are split between holders of its Global Depository Receipts and minority shareholders, both individuals and companies.

2020 and onward 
As of February 2022 the bank reported that its stock shares are distributed in the following way:

 12.13% of (capital) shares – Federal Agency for State Property Management (Russia)
 32.88% of (capital) shares – Ministry of Finance (Russia)
 47.22% of (capital) shares – Deposit Insurance Agency of Russia

Executive Management
As of April 2022, its Management Committee (referred as VTB Bank Management Board or VTB MB) includes:

 Andrey Kostin - Chief executive of the Bank (since 10 June 2002), President and Chairman of VTB Bank Management Board, Member of the Supervisory Council,
 Andrey Puchkov (First Deputy President and Chairman of VTB MB)
 Denis Bortnikov (Deputy President and Chairman of VTB MB)
 Olga Dergunova (Deputy President and Chairman of VTB MB)
 Valery Lukyanenko (Deputy President and Chairman of VTB MB)
 Anatoly Pechatnikov (Deputy President and Chairman of VTB MB)
 Maxim Kondratenko (Member of VTB MB)
 Erkin Norov (Member of VTB MB)
 Dmitriy Pianov (Member of VTB MB)

Supervisory council
, VTB's Supervisory Council consists of Anton Siluanov (Chairman of the Supervisory Council), Matthias Warnig (member of the Supervisory Council),[8] Sergey Dubinin (member of supervisory council), Mikhail Zadornov (Member of Supervisory Council), Andrey Kostin (President and Chairman of VTB Bank Management Board), Shahmar Movsumov (Independent member of supervisory council), Igor Repin (Independent member of Supervisory Council), Alexander Sokolov (Member of Supervisory Council), Vladimir Chistyukhin (member of supervisory council), Mukhadin Eskindarov (Member of Supervisory Council).

Financial data
Consolidated Statement of Financial Position as at 31 December 2021: net interest income – 646,3 RUB billion, net fee and commission income – 90,0 RUB billion, operating income before provisions – 822,7 RUB billion, staff costs and administrative expenses – -308,8 RUB billion, net profit – 327,4 RUB billion.

Major subsidiaries

VTB's major subsidiaries as of April 2022 were:

Sports sponsorships 

VTB is one of the sponsors of all Dinamo Moscow sport clubs.

Since 2017, VTB Bank has been the title partner of the Russian Formula 1 stage in Sochi – Formula 1 VTB Russian Grand Prix.

Since 2016, VTB has been the tennis tournament VTB Kremlin Cup.

VTB has also been the title sponsor of the VTB United League since 2008.
Since 2005, VTB Bank has been the general sponsor of the Kamaz Master team, a team which has been active in re-known rally raid such as Dakar Rally, Silk Way Rally and Africa Eco Race.

Since 2013, VTB Group has been supporting the Velobike, a bicycle-sharing system in Moscow, a project by the Department for Transport and Development of Road Infrastructure of the city. In 2018, the number of trips exceeded 3 million.

Sanctions

On 29 July 2014, the Office of Foreign Assets Control (OFAC) published that the Bank of Moscow and VTB Bank OJSC, the second largest bank in Russia, has been added to the Sectoral Sanctions Identifications List.

On 31 July 2014, VTB Bank and its subsidiaries was added to the European Union sanctions list due to its role in the Crimean Crisis that same year.

On 6 August 2014, VTB was added to the Canadian sanctions list due to its role in the Russo-Ukrainian War and the downing of Malaysia Airlines Flight 17.

On 13 August 2014, United States clarifies entities under sectoral sanctions. United States increases its sectoral sanctions on VTB Bank together with its subsidiaries (“the VTB Group”) and the Bank of Moscow through its parent bank, VTB Bank OAO, and other entities that VTB has 50 percent or greater ownership either individually or in the aggregate, either directly or indirectly. Also, US persons cannot use a third party intermediary and they must use caution during "transactions with a non-blocked entity in which one or more blocked persons has a significant ownership interest that is less than 50 percent or which one or more blocked persons may control by means other than a majority ownership interest."

On 1 September 2014, VTB was added to the Australian autonomous sanctions list for Russia, Crimea, and Sevastopol.

On 12 September 2014, the United States issues a consolidated listing of directives associated with Executive Order 13662 sanctions during the crisis in Ukraine. For the Russian financial sector, Directive 1 was amended to increase the financial sanctions on the Russian financial sector for "all transactions in, provision of financing for, and other dealings" in new equity or new debt issued on or after 12 September 2014 to longer than 30 days maturity. New equity or new debt issued from 29 July 2018 until 12 September 2018 was sanctioned if longer than 90 days maturity.

In 2015 the banks' chief Executive Andrei Kostin predicted loses for the bank in the years to come because of the plunging ruble accelerated by western sanctions.

On 15 March 2017, Ukraine imposed sanctions against VTB Bank and subsidiaries because of the ongoing Russian interference in Ukraine.

On 28 November 2017, the United States increases the Executive Order 13662 sanctions to the Russian financial sector. For the Russian financial sector, Directive 1 was amended to increase the financial sanctions on the Russian financial sector for "all transactions in, provision of financing for, and other dealings" in new equity or new debt issued on or after 28 November 2017 to longer than 14 days maturity. New equity or new debt issued from 12 September 2014 until 28 November 2017 was sanctioned if longer than 30 days maturity.

On 27 November 2018, the National Bank of Ukraine declares the Ukrainian subsidiary of VTB Bank insolvent due to its declining liquidity and worsening financial position.

On 25 June 2020 European Court of Justice rejected VTB and Sberbank bank's 2014 lawsuit against EU sectoral sanctions citing that regulators were within their aims of "imposing a cost on the Russian government" because of the latter's actions in Ukraine. The Court specified that intentionally ambigous language versions of the regulation (that the bank argued were wrongly applied) doesn't prevent the Court to from choosing one that fits best its general purposes.

In February 2022, amid the Russo-Ukrainian crisis, US and EU officials were reportedly finalizing an extensive package of sanctions on VTB bank and other related Russian entities. On 24 February, after Russia launched a full-scale invasion of Ukraine, US president Joe Biden and British prime minister Boris Johnson announced new sanctions against VTB bank along with other Russian individuals and companies.

See also

Timeline of Russian interference in the 2016 United States elections
Timeline of investigations into Trump and Russia (July–December 2017)
East-West United Bank

References

External links

VTB corporate site
Russian website
VTB Armenia
List of Georgian Banks

Banks of Russia
Companies based in Moscow
Companies listed on the Moscow Exchange
Banks established in 1990
Russian brands
Government-owned companies of Russia
Russian entities subject to the U.S. Department of the Treasury sanctions
Government-owned banks